Anthony George (born Ottavio Gabriel George; January 29, 1921 – March 16, 2005) was an American actor mostly seen on television.  He is best known for roles of Don Corey in CBS's Checkmate, Burke Devlin #2 and Jeremiah Collins on ABC's Dark Shadows, as Dr. Tony Vincente on CBS's Search for Tomorrow, and Dr. Will Vernon #3 on ABC's One Life to Live.

Background
He was born in Endicott, New York, near Binghamton, the second son of Italian immigrant parents. From the age of six, George dreamed of being in films. After serving in World War II, George moved to Hollywood. Though the first few years were lean, by 1950, he had received his first credit and the work began to accumulate. The vast majority of George's roles were on television.

Acting career
In 1955, George appeared as Sergei in the episode "Mightier Than the Sword" of the religion anthology television series, Crossroads, based on stories about American clergymen. He was cast as an Indian guide in the 1956 episode "Death in the Snow" of NBC's anthology series, The Joseph Cotten Show: On Trial; Cotten later returned the favor, guest-starring in the episode "Face in the Window" of Checkmate. George portrayed Indian roles in the CBS western series, Brave Eagle, starring Keith Larsen as a young Cheyenne chief who tries to maintain peace with the white community. George was cast in the episodes "The Treachery of At-Ta-Tu" (1955), as Night Wind in "Voice of the Serpent" (1955), and as Red Wing in "Witch Bear" (1956).

In 1957, he appeared as Sancho Mendariz on the TV western Cheyenne in the episode, "The Spanish Grant". On July 31, 1957, George was cast as Nick Frazee, a bank robber who kills a deputy sheriff before making his getaway, in the episode "Hold Up" of the series Sheriff of Cochise, in which Sheriff Frank Morgan (John Bromfield), based in Cochise County, Arizona, establishes roadblocks in pursuit of Frazee and two of his men, but the fleeing bandits take an isolated road into the mountains.

In 1958, he played an escaped mental patient in an episode of Highway Patrol, a police drama starring Broderick Crawford. (The first name of George's acting credits is sometimes Anthony, sometimes Tony.) In January 1959, George played a Roman Catholic priest, Padre John, in the episode "The Desperadoes" of the western series, Sugarfoot. Later in 1959, George was first cast as federal agent Cam Allison in the first season of ABC's The Untouchables, with Robert Stack. He appeared in twelve episodes before he landed his role on Checkmate. After Checkmate ended, he appeared as the lead character in "The Johnny Masters Story" episode of Wagon Train.

Soap opera star
George's longest-running success came from his decades-long career in daytime television soap-operas. In 1967, George replaced Mitchell Ryan as the brooding Burke Devlin on Dark Shadows. Some months later, the character was "killed" in a plane crash, and George created the role of Jeremiah Collins in a flashback to the year 1795. The story ran for most of 1967, until Jeremiah was killed off. George obtained further roles on CBS's Search for Tomorrow (as Dr. Tony Vincente, 1970–75) and One Life to Live (as Dr. Will Vernon #3).

In the late 1970s and early 1980s, One Life to Live was written and produced by many Dark Shadows alumni, which led to a scene where former Dark Shadows stars George, Nancy Barrett, and Grayson Hall, as their Llanview counterparts, wondered where they had previously met. After being written out of One Life to Live in 1984, George continued to make sporadic film and television appearances. In 1988, he played the role of Alex Karides in "Baja, Humbug" in the CBS crime drama, Simon and Simon.

Filmography

References

External links

1921 births
2005 deaths
American people of Italian descent
American military personnel of World War II
American male television actors
American male soap opera actors
American male film actors
Male actors from New York (state)
Deaths from emphysema
People from Endicott, New York
Military personnel from New York (state)
20th-century American male actors